Gürkan is a Turkish surname and given name for males. The word "Gürkan", is a Persianized form of the Mongolian word "Kuragan" (or Guregen) meaning "son-in-law". This was an honorific title used by the Timurid dynasty as the Timurids were in-laws of the line of Genghis Khan, founder of the Mongol Empire, as Timur had married Saray Mulk Khanum, a direct descendant of Genghis Khan.

People named Gürkan include:

Given name
 Gürkan Coşkun (born 1941), Turkish painter
 Gürkan Ekren (born 1974), Turkish football player
 Gürkan Sermeter (born 1974), Swiss football player of Turkish descent
 Gürkan Uygun (born 1974), Turkish actor

Middle name
 Mehmet Gürkan Öztürk (born 1989), Turkish footballer

Surname
 Aydın Güven Gürkan (1941–2006), Turkish academic and politician
 Cevat Gürkan (1907–1984), Turkish equestrian
 Emrah Safa Gürkan (born 1981), Turkish historian and academic
 Fatoş Gürkan (born 1966), Turkish lawyer and politician
 Recep Gürkan (born 1964), Turkish politician
 Selma Gürkan (born 1961), Turkish unionist and politician
 Umut A. Gurkan, Turkish–American engineer

References

Turkish masculine given names
Turkish-language surnames